Verreaux's mouse or Verreaux's white-footed rat (Myomyscus verreauxii) is a species of rodent in the family Muridae. It is the only member of the genus Myomyscus. Other species that had been previously assigned to Myomyscus are now considered to belong to the genera Mastomys, Ochromyscus, Praomys and Stenocephalemys.

It is found only in South Africa.
Its natural habitats are temperate forests and Mediterranean-type shrubby vegetation.

References

Endemic fauna of South Africa
Old World rats and mice
Mammals of South Africa
Mammals described in 1834
Taxonomy articles created by Polbot